"Fall to Pieces" is a power ballad written and performed by Velvet Revolver that appears on their debut album Contraband in 2004. It was the band's third single, and reached #67 on the Billboard Hot 100 and #1 on the Mainstream Rock chart.

Content
The song's lyrics are about then lead singer Scott Weiland's battle with heroin and its toll on his relationship with his wife, model Mary Forsberg.

Chart performance
The song was #1 on the Billboard Hot Mainstream Rock Tracks chart for 11 consecutive weeks and #2 on the Billboard Hot Modern Rock Tracks chart for a single week. It also hit #67 on the Billboard Hot 100. The band performed the song during their performance at Live 8; its performance is the only one of the three songs they played there that appears on the concert DVD.

Composition
The song is played with 1/2 step down-tuned guitars, unlike most of Velvet Revolver's catalogue. Similar to "Sweet Child o' Mine" by Guns N' Roses (Slash, McKagan and Sorum's previous band), the song is in the key of D flat Mixolydian, and is based on an arpeggiated riff around the Dsus4 chord. Weiland wrote the lyrics; Slash, McKagan, Kushner, and Sorum composed the music.

Music video
The song's music video follows the meaning of the song, showing Weiland struggling to maintain his relationship with his wife (who appears in the video as herself). It depicts Scott going through an overdose, but being rescued by Duff McKagan.

Track listing
 "Fall to Pieces" - 4:30
 "Surrender" - 4:25

Personnel
Scott Weiland - lead vocals
Slash - lead guitar
Duff McKagan - bass, backing vocals
Matt Sorum - drums, percussion, backing vocals
Dave Kushner - rhythm guitar

Charts

Notes

2000s ballads
2004 singles
2004 songs
Velvet Revolver songs
Hard rock ballads
Songs written by Slash (musician)
Songs written by Matt Sorum
Songs written by Duff McKagan
Songs written by Scott Weiland
Songs written by Dave Kushner
RCA Records singles
Song recordings produced by Josh Abraham
Music videos directed by Kevin Kerslake